Tudor Gunaratne (born 31 March 1966) is a Sri Lankan former first-class cricketer who played for Kandy Cricket Club and Kandy Youth Cricket Club.

References

External links
 

1966 births
Living people
Sri Lankan cricketers
Kandy Cricket Club cricketers
Kandy Youth Cricket Club cricketers
Sportspeople from Kandy